The 2009–10 season was the 86th season in the existence of AEK Athens F.C. and the 51st consecutive season in the top flight of Greek football. They competed in the Super League, the Greek Cup and the UEFA Europa League. The season began on 20 August 2009 and finished on 19 May 2010.

Overview

Training for the new season began on June 29, 2009. Daniel Majstorovic, Edinho, Rafik Djebbour, Perparim Hetemaj, Antonis Rikka, Vasilios Pliatsikas, Michalis Pavlis and Panagiotis Tachtsidis were all exempted as they were away on international duty.
They will kick off the 2009–10 season at home versus arch rivals Olympiacos on August 30, 2009.
On July 11, 2009, Pantelis Kafes was selected as the new captain, Daniel Majstorovic, Nikolaos Georgeas  and Tam Nsaliwa were selected as vice-captains. The club sold a total of 17,350 season tickets.

Events
 29 May: Young midfielder Giorgos Tofas joins Anorthosis from AEK Athens.
 10 June: Full-back Nikolaos Karabelas joins AEK Athens from Aris.
 12 June: Goalkeeper Stefano Sorrentino joins Chievo from AEK Athens.
 12 June: Midfielder Pantelis Kafes signs a new 3-year deal.
 16 June: Young centre-back Kostas Manolas joins AEK Athens from Thrasyvoulos.
 17 June: Winger Ilie Iordache joins AEK Athens from Pandurii.
 24 June: Midfielder Grigoris Makos joins AEK Athens from Panionios.
 29 June: Goalkeeper Milan Lukač joins AEK Athens from Čukarički.
 30 June: Midfielder Vasilios Pliatsikas joins Schalke 04 from AEK Athens.
 7 July: Striker Edinho joins Málaga from AEK Athens.
 6 August: Winger Leonardo joins AEK Athens from Levadiakos.
 18 August: Full-back Carlos Araujo joins AEK Athens from Huracán.
 20 August: Young winger El Hadji Diouf is released from AEK Athens.
 21 August: Strong centre-back Sotiris Kyrgiakos joins Liverpool.
 25 August: Striker Krisztián Németh joins AEK Athens on loan from Liverpool.
 26 August: Striker Nathan Burns joins Kerkyra on loan from AEK Athens.
 27 August: Midfielder Roger Guerreiro joins AEK Athens from Legia Warszawa.
 30 August: Midfielder Youssouf Hersi joins AEK Athens from Twente.
 30 August: Midfielder Perparim Hetemaj joins Twente from AEK Athens.
 31 August: Midfielder Sanel Jahić joins AEK Athens from Aris.
 31 August: Centre-back Nicolás Arce joins AEK Athens from San Lorenzo.
 29 January: Experienced full-back Juanfran joins Levante on loan from AEK Athens.
 20 May: Midfielder Savvas Gentsoglou signs new 4-year deal.
 27 May: Midfielder Panagiotis Lagos signs new 3-year deal.

Players

Squad information

NOTE: The players are the ones that have been announced by the AEK Athens' press release. No edits should be made unless a player arrival or exit is announced. Updated 30 June 2010, 23:59 UTC+3.

Transfers

In

Summer

Winter

Out

Summer

Loan in

Summer

Loan out

Summer

Winter

 a.  plus 25% of next sale.
 b.  plus 40% of next sale.
 c.  plus Krisztián Németh on one-year free loan.
 d.  plus 20% of next sale.

Renewals

Overall transfer activity

Expenditure
Summer:  €3,200,000

Winter:  €0

Total:  €3,200,000

Income
Summer:  €4,880,000

Winter:  €30,000

Total:  €4,910,000

Net Totals
Summer:  €1,680,000

Winter:  €30,000

Total:  €1,710,000

Club

Management

Kit

|

|

|

Other information

Manager stats

Starting 11

References

External links
AEK Athens F.C. Official Website
AEK Athens FC on Superleaguegreece.net

Greek football clubs 2009–10 season
2009-10